A housewife is a wife who stays at home, as a homemaker, and frequently, a mother.  It also refers to a cloth case or bag for needles, thread, etc.  

Housewife, housewives, or similar, may also refer to:

 Housewife (film), a 1934 U.S. drama film
 "Housewife" (song), a 2004 song by The Cribs
 Housewife (band), an indie band from Toronto formerly known as Moscow Apartment

See also

 Desperate Housewives (TV series), a U.S. drama TV show
 The Real Housewives (franchise), a reality television franchise
 Housewife of the Year (contest), a mid-to-late-20th century Irish pageant
 The Compleat Housewife (book), an 18th century cookbook
 Today's Housewife (periodical), an early-20th century magazine

 
 
 
 Househusband
 Work wife
 Ex-wife
 House (disambiguation)
 Wife (disambiguation)